Janko Kobentar (born 1 April 1940) is a Slovenian cross-country skier. He competed in the men's 15 kilometre event at the 1964 Winter Olympics.

References

1940 births
Living people
Slovenian male cross-country skiers
Olympic cross-country skiers of Yugoslavia
Cross-country skiers at the 1964 Winter Olympics
Sportspeople from Novo Mesto